Daddy You, Daughter Me is a 2017 South Korean comedy film directed by Kim Hyeong-hyeop. It is based on the 2006 Japanese novel Papa to Musume no Nanokakan by Takahisa Igarashi.

Plot
The titular father and daughter swap bodies after a car accident and are forced to go through each other's life without letting the mother know.

Cast
Yoon Je-moon as Won Sang-tae
Jung So-min as Won Do-yeon
Lee Seol-ah as young Do-yeon 1
Kwak Ji-hye as young Do-yeon 2
Lee Il-hwa as Mom 
Shin Goo as Grandpa
Lee Mi-do as Deputy Na Yoon-mi
Heo Ga-yoon as Ahn Kyung-mi
Min Do-hee as Bae Jin-young
Kang Ki-young as Deputy Joo Jang-won
G.O as Director Jeon
Park Hyuk-kwon as Jeong Byeong-jin 
Lee Yoo-jin as Kang Ji-oh
Jang Won-young as President Kwon
Kim Jong-gu as Chairman
Kang Seung-wan as Section chief Kang
Kim In-kwon (special appearance)
Park Myeong-su (special appearance)
Lee Ho-joon (special appearance)

References

External links

2017 films
2017 comedy-drama films
Films based on Japanese novels
South Korean comedy-drama films
Body swapping in films
Films about father–daughter relationships
2010s South Korean films